Povl Wøldike (13 August 1899 – 25 July 1975) was a Danish film actor. He appeared in 32 films between 1938 and 1970. He was born in Copenhagen, Denmark and died in Denmark.

Filmography

 Og så er der bal bagefter (1970)
 Hurra for de blå husarer (1970)
 Et godt liv (1970)
 Onkel Joakims hemmelighed (1967)
 Eurydike (1964)
 Støv for alle pengene (1963)
 Pigen og pressefotografen (1963)
 Reptilicus (1961)
 Skibet er ladet med (1960)
 Vi er allesammen tossede (1959)
 Pigen og vandpytten (1958)
 Ung kærlighed (1958)
 Krudt og klunker (1958)
 Far til fire og onkel Sofus (1957)
 Skovridergaarden (1957)
 Bundfald (1957)
 Den kloge mand (1956)
 Sukceskomponisten (1954)
 This Is Life (1953)
 Fløjtespilleren (1953)
 Kærlighedsdoktoren (1952)
 Vores fjerde far (1951)
 Lyn-fotografen (1950)
 Lejlighed til leje (1949)
 Den stjaalne minister (1949)
 Hatten er sat (1947)
 Brevet fra afdøde (1946)
 Frihed, lighed og Louise (1944)
 Det ender med bryllup (1943)
 Forellen (1942)
 Afsporet (1942)
 Den mandlige husassistent (1938)

External links

1899 births
1975 deaths
Danish male film actors
Male actors from Copenhagen